Selective auditory attention or selective hearing is a type of selective attention and involves the auditory system. Selective hearing is characterized as the action in which people focus their attention intentionally on a specific source of a sound or spoken words. When people use selective hearing, noise from the surrounding environment is heard by the auditory system but only certain parts of the auditory information are chosen to be processed by the brain. 

Most often, auditory attention is directed at things people are most interested in hearing. Selective hearing is not a physiological disorder but rather it is the capability of humans to block out sounds and noise. It is the notion of ignoring certain things in the surrounding environment. 

The dividing line between preference and utility is not clear cut. 

Selective auditory attention differs from selective perception, in that the filtering in the latter case is mediated by cognitive dissonance.

Background 

In an article by Krans, Isbell, Giuliano, and Neville (2013), selective auditory attention is defined as the ability to acknowledge some stimuli while ignoring other stimuli that is occurring at the same time. An example of this is a student focusing on a teacher giving a lesson and ignoring the sounds of classmates in a rowdy classroom (p. 53). This is an example of bottlenecking which means that information cannot be processed simultaneously so only some sensory information gets through the "bottleneck" and is processed. A brain simply cannot process all sensory information that is occurring in an environment so only the most relevant and important information is thoroughly processed by the brain. There have been some models that theorize the pathway of selective auditory attention, notably the early selection model, late selection model, and attenuation model.

History 
Early researches on selective auditory attention can be traced back to 1953, when Colin Cherry introduced the "cocktail party problem". At the time, air traffic controllers at the control tower received messages from pilots through loudspeakers. Hearing mixed voices through a single loudspeaker made the task very difficult. In Cherry's experiment, mimicking the problem faced by air traffic controllers, participants had to listen to two messages played simultaneously from one loudspeaker and repeat what they heard. This was later termed the dichotic listening task.    

Though introduced by Colin Cherry, Donald Broadbent is often regarded as the first to systematically apply dichotic listening tests in his research. Broadbent used the method of dichotic listening to test how participants selectively attend to stimuli when overloaded with auditory stimuli; Broadbent used his findings to develop the filter model of attention in 1958. Broadbent theorized that the human information processing system has a "bottleneck" due to limited capacity and that the brain performs an "early selection" before processing auditory information. Broadbent proposed that auditory information enters an unlimited sensory buffer and that one stream of information is filtered out and passes through the bottleneck to be cohesive, while all others that are not selected quickly decay in salience and are not processed. Broadbent's model contradicts with the cocktail party phenomenon because Broadbent's model predicts that people would never respond to their names from unattended sources since unattended information is discarded before being processed.    

Deutsch & Deutsch's late selection model that was proposed in 1963 is a competing model to Broadbent's early selection model. Deutsch & Deutsch's model theorizes that all information and sensory input are attended to and processed for meaning. Later in the processing routine, just before information enters the short-term memory, a filter analyzes the semantic characteristics of the information and lets stimuli containing relevant information pass through to short-term memory and removes irrelevant information. Deutsch & Deutsch's model for selective auditory attention suggests that weak response to unattended stimuli comes from an internal decision on informational relevance, where more important stimuli are prioritized to enter the working memory first. 

In 1964, Anne Treisman, a graduate student of Broadbent, improved Broadent's theory and proposed her own attenuation model. In Treisman's model, unattended information is attenuated, tuned down compared to attended information, but still processed. For example, imagine that you are exposed to three extraneous sources of sound in a coffee shop while ordering a drink (chatter, coffee brewer, music), Treisman's model indicates that you would still pick up on the latter three sounds while attending to the cashier, just that these extraneous sources of noise would be muffled as if their "volumes" were turned down. Treisman also suggests that a threshold mechanism exists in selective auditory attention in which words from the unattended stream of information can grab one's attention. Words of low threshold, higher level of meaning and importance, such as one's name and "watch out", redirects one's attention to where it is urgently required.

Recent research 
Recently, researchers have attempted to explain mechanisms implicated in selective auditory attention. In 2012, an assistant professor in residence of the Neurological Surgery and Physiology in the University of California San Francisco examined the selective cortical representation of attended speaker in multiple-talker speech perception. Edward Chang and his colleague, Nima Mesgarani undertook a study that recruited three patients affected by severe epilepsy, who were undergoing treatment surgery. All patients were recorded to have normal hearing. The procedure of this study required the surgeons to place a thin sheet of electrodes under the skull on the outer surface of the cortex. The activity of electrodes was recorded in the auditory cortex. The patients were given two speech samples to listen to and they were told to distinguish the words spoken by the speakers. The speech samples were simultaneously played and different speech phrases were spoken by different speakers. Chang and Mesgarani found an increase in neural responses in the auditory cortex when the patients heard words from the target speaker. Chang went on to explain that the method of this experiment was well-conducted as it was able to observe the neural patterns that tells when the patient's auditory attention shifted to the other speaker. This clearly shows the selectivity of auditory attention in humans.

The development of selective attention has also been examined. Jones and Moore for instance, studied how well children across various age groups could hear and respond to a target sound when it was masked by other auditory stimuli. They discovered that 9– to 11-year-old children became as adept as adults at paying attention only to the target sound and filtering out the masking sound (2015, p. 366). This shows that research on selective auditory information is important to continue as it allows us to better understand our world.

Prevalence 
The prevalence of selective hearing has not been clearly researched yet. However, there are some that have argued that the proportion of selective hearing is particularly higher in males than females. Ida Zündorf, Hans-Otto Karnath and Jörg Lewald carried out a study in 2010 which investigated the advantages and abilities males have in the localization of auditory information. A sound localization task centered on the cocktail party effect was utilized in their study. The male and female participants had to try to pick out sounds from a specific source, on top of other competing sounds from other sources. The results showed that the males had a better performance overall. Female participants found it more difficult to locate target sounds in a multiple-source environment. Zündorf et al. suggested that there may be sex differences in the attention processes that helped locate the target sound from a multiple-source auditory field. While men and women do have some differences when it comes to selective auditory hearing, they both struggle when presented with the challenge of multitasking, especially when tasks that are to be attempted concurrently are very similar in nature (Dittrich, and Stahl, 2012, p. 626).

Disorder status 
Selective hearing is not known to be a disorder of the physiological or psychological aspect. Under the World Health Organization (WHO), a hearing disorder happens when there is a complete loss of hearing in the ears. It means the loss of the ability to hear. Technically speaking, selective hearing is not "deafness" to a certain sound message. Rather, it is the selectivity of an individual to attend audibly to a sound message. The whole sound message is physically heard by the ear but the brain systematically filters out unwanted information to focus on relevant important portions of the message. Therefore, selective hearing should not be confused as a physiological hearing disorder. Selective auditory attention is a normal sensory process of the brain, and there can be abnormalities related to this process in people with sensory processing disorders such as attention deficit hyperactive disorder, post traumatic stress disorder, schizophrenia, selective mutism, and in stand-alone auditory processing disorders.

See also 
 Auditory processing disorders
 Cognitive inhibition
 Confirmation bias
 Highway hypnosis
 Sensory processing disorders

References 

Attention
Auditory system